Life Begins Again is the debut studio album by the Jimmy Chamberlin Complex (side project band of The Smashing Pumpkins/Zwan drummer Jimmy Chamberlin). It was released on January 25, 2005 and as an Enhanced CD. The album stars several guest musicians and vocalists including Billy Corgan (Smashing Pumpkins), Bill Medley (The Righteous Brothers), and Rob Dickinson (Catherine Wheel).

Track listing
All songs were written by Jimmy Chamberlin and Billy Mohler, except where noted.
 "Streetcrawler" (Chamberlin, Mohler, Sean Woolstenhulme) – 4:05
 "Life Begins Again" – 3:44
 Features Rob Dickinson on vocals
 "P.S.A." (Chamberlin, Mohler, Woolstenhulme) – 5:46
 "Loki Cat" (Chamberlin, Mohler, Woolstenhulme) – 4:09
 Features Billy Corgan on vocals
 "Cranes of Prey" – 5:18
 "Love Is Real" – 3:22
 Features Rob Dickinson on vocals
 "Owed to Darryl" (Chamberlin, Mohler, Woolstenhulme) – 5:14
 "Newerwaves" – 4:13
 "Time Shift" – 2:43
 "Lullabye" – 3:45
 Features Bill Medley on vocals
 Lyrics by Becca Popkin
 "Loki Cat (Reprise)" (Chamberlin, Mohler, Woolstenhulme) – 1:11

Personnel
 Jimmy Chamberlin – drums, producer, writer
 Billy Mohler – bass, keyboards, guitar, writer, vocals on "Streetcrawler" and "Newerwaves"
 Sean Woolstenhulme – guitar, writer
 Adam Benjamin – Fender Rhodes
 Paul Chamberlin – additional drums on "Loki Cat"
 Corey Wilton – lead guitar on "Love Is Real", additional guitar on "Time Shift", art concept
 Linda Strawberry – backing vocals on "Lullabye"
 Tom Rothrock – mixer
 Mike Tarantino – assistant to Tom Rothrock
 Edmund Monsef – engineer
 Forrest Borie – video content production and editing
 Frank Gironda – management

References

The Jimmy Chamberlin Complex albums
2005 debut albums
Sanctuary Records albums